Kinna is a locality and the seat of Mark Municipality, Västra Götaland County, Sweden. It had 14,776 inhabitants in 2010.

The original Kinna has grown together with surrounding Skene and Örby making up the present locality.

People from Kinna
Jonas Jerebko, professional basketball player, second Swedish-born player to ever be selected in the NBA Draft
Mor Kerstin i Stämmemand-Kinna
Oskar Palmquist, playing for Rutgers University Basketball Team
Gabriella Quevedo

References 

Populated places in Västra Götaland County
Populated places in Mark Municipality
Municipal seats of Västra Götaland County
Swedish municipal seats